The Blenheim Riverside Railway (BRRS or BRR) is a  narrow gauge heritage railway in Blenheim, New Zealand. It runs along the Taylor River, which winds its way through the middle of the town. It is operated by the all-volunteer Blenheim Riverside Railway Society.

History
The railway society was founded in 1985 by members of the Marlborough Historical Society, and shortly after rail was sourced and a workshop constructed. The line was progressively laid from 1987 and the railway officially opened in 1990. Four carriages were built in 1989/90, and the A & G Price locomotive (later named "George") was restored and put into service. The first station at Brayshaw Park was very basic, however during 1995 Beaver Station (now Brayshaw Station) was constructed, with an extension of track from the workshop requiring a cutting and embankment with a steep gradient. In 2005 the track was extended to the current terminus at Beaver Station (with the station at Brayshaw Park renamed) by Riverside Park. Over the years the workshops have been enlarged, and concrete sleepers made by the volunteer members have been used to replace the wooden ones first used on the line. March 2015 saw the opening of a branch line extension to Omaka Airfield.

Operations
Trains run normally on the first and third Sundays of every month for the general public. Trains also run extra days during school holidays and over late December / early January. These use both the main line and branch line, with trains departing Brayshaw Park Station at 1:15 and 3:00 to Omaka and at 1:45 to Beaver Station. The train can be chartered on most days for tour groups, etc.

Track

Main Line
The railway follows the Taylor River from Brayshaw Park in the southwest of Blenheim to Beaver Station, near a wharf where the 'River Queen' boat formerly docked. There are locomotive run-around or passing loops at Brayshaw Park, Chinaman's Creek Crossing, Fulton Station and Beaver Station. The route is 5.1 km long. There are six bridges and five road overbridges. At Beaver Station the line passes under the Main North Line Taylor River bridge. Light ~55lb per/yard (27kg/m) ex New Zealand Railways rail is used for majority of the line, and the track is buried up to rail head level as most is laid on reserve land.

Omaka Branch Line
The 1km line to Omaka branches off shortly after leaving Brayshaw Park, crosses the Taylor River on a 46m concrete bridge, ending at Omaka Corlett Station near the Omaka Aviation Heritage Centre and Omaka Classic Cars buildings. Tracklaying began during 2013/2014. It was expected that the extension would be completed in time for the 2015 Omaka Airshow, and was opened on Saturday, 21 March 2015.  The Society's efforts in constructing the branch line were recognised with an infrastructure award from KiwiRail at the FRONZ conference over Queen's Birthday weekend 2015.

Coordinates of terminal stations
Brayshaw Park Station: 
Beaver Station: 
Omaka Station

Rolling stock

Locomotives

The railway has a small collection of diesel locomotives. In 1986 the society acquired A & G Price Da 6 from Horrell & Sons of Gore. This locomotive, first of a batch of three, was constructed to work coal mines in Ohai. It was overhauled in 2010, replacing the original Leyland powerplant with an Isuzu, and named "George" after a long serving member of the Society. November 2016 the Society purchased A&G Price Da 8, last remaining sister of "George" and two bogie carriages. These came from Totara Springs Christian Centre near Matamata, after use on the Kerikeri Orchard Railway who originally obtained the loco from Ohai. The locomotive entered service in 2017 after refitting of ballast blocks each end of the frame, brake system modifications and a new livery. Ruston & Hornsby 170204 was purchased from the Ashburton Vintage Car Club, regauged and overhauled, officially entering service in 1997 named "Murray". The year 2012 saw the arrival of two locomotives. A homebuilt hydraulic bogie loco, formerly used at a private railway in the Marlborough Sounds was donated by the constructors' family, and named "Onahau" after its former home. A second Ruston, of 20DL type but with steam loco outline body, was purchased from Auckland and once worked at the short lived Footrot Flats theme park. It is not used for passenger service, but is still equipped with air brakes and is used mainly for workshop shunting.

Rolling stock
Four carriages were built in 1989-90 with wheelsets from some of the remaining  Lake Grassmere Saltworks  Hudson salt tipper wagons. The first three are 4.5m long and seat 24 adults with "toast rack" seating. Car Four is slightly longer with the same seating capacity, but with wheelchair access available in the two end compartments. All carriages are air braked. A bogie diesel railcar, known as RM 1, was built in the 1990s, and sees occasional use, mostly on the Omaka branch line. The two  ex-Matamata cars also are 6m long and had "toast rack" seating. These two cars are undergoing rebuilding to become a permanent pair sharing a Jacobs bogie. Maintenance of the railway line is carried out using a work train consisting of multi deck tool wagon, flat deck wagons, and crew car for workers. Spraying of weeds and mowing of grass along the line are performed with separate purpose built trollies, pulled or pushed by the "Onahau" loco, due to its low speed.

References

External links
BRRS Website
 BRR Facebook Page

Blenheim, New Zealand
Rail transport in the Marlborough Region
Heritage railways in New Zealand
2 ft gauge railways in New Zealand
Buildings and structures in Blenheim, New Zealand
Tourist attractions in the Marlborough Region